is a 1995 Japan-exclusive board video game for the Super Famicom.

References

1995 video games
Bandai games
Digital board games
Fortyfive games
Japan-exclusive video games
Super Nintendo Entertainment System games
Super Nintendo Entertainment System-only games
Video games developed in Japan